Corinto is a town and municipality in the Cauca Department, Colombia.

Yordan Guetio of Corinto, a social activist, was murdered on February 2, 2021. He was the twentieth such human rights activist murdered, along with five massacres and one signer of a peace agreement who is missing as of this date in 2021.

A car bomb exploded on March 27, 2021, injuring eleven.

References

Municipalities of Cauca Department